The Battle of Batočina was fought on 29–30 August 1689 near the town of Batočina in the Sanjak of Smederevo (now in central Serbia), between Holy Roman and Ottoman forces during the Great Turkish War (1683–99).

On 29 August 1689 the Serbian Militia under the command of Pavle Nestorović as a vanguard unit of the Habsburg army was victorious against a vanguard unit of the Ottoman army during the Battle of Batočina. The Holy Roman Empire was victorious.

References

Sources 

Battles of the Great Turkish War
Battles involving the Ottoman Empire
Battles involving the Holy Roman Empire
Conflicts in 1689
17th century in Serbia
Battles involving Serbia
1689 in the Habsburg monarchy
1689 in the Ottoman Empire
Serbia under Habsburg rule